KSEG may refer to:
 KSEG (FM), a radio station (96.9 FM) licensed to Sacramento, California, United States
 KSEG (software), a geometry software
 Penn Valley Airport's ICAO code